Utah State Route 159 may refer to:

 Utah State Route 159, a state highway on the western edge of Millard County, Utah, United States, that runs parallel to the Utah-Nevada border.
 Utah State Route 159 (1945-1969), a former state highway on the western edge of Utah County, Utah, United States, that essentially formed a business loop off U.S. Route 6, running along Dividend Road through the community of Dividend.
 Utah State Route 159 (1933-1945),  a former state highway in southwestern Salt Lake County, Utah, United States, that ran west from Riverton to Lark and then north to Magna.

See also
 List of state highways in Utah
 List of highways numbered 159